Shahid Sarlashgar Sha'ban Barkhordari 03 Ajabshir Recruit Training Centre, commonly known as Ajab Shir 03 Garrison ( – Pādegān-e Seh-ye ʿAjab Shīr) is a village and military installation in Dizajrud-e Gharbi Rural District of the Central District of Ajab Shir County, East Azerbaijan province, Iran. At the 2006 census, its population was 852 in 205 households. The following census in 2011 counted 4,719 people in 209 households. The latest census in 2016 showed a population of 5,423 people in 148 households; it was the largest village in its rural district.

References 

Ajab Shir County

Populated places in East Azerbaijan Province

Populated places in Ajab Shir County

Recruit training centres of Ground Forces of Islamic Republic of Iran Army